The Badshot Range is a subrange of the Duncan Ranges of the Selkirk Mountains of the Columbia Mountains in southeastern British Columbia, Canada, located west of Duncan Lake and Westfall River east of Trout Lake.

Peaks of this range include:

References

Selkirk Mountains